Donald Fraser was a Scottish footballer who played for Sheffield United as a half back Signed in 1889 he had answered United's advert in the Scottish press asking for players to form a club, although he stayed with the Bramall Lane side for just their inaugural season which consisted mainly of friendly fixtures. Known as 'the little Scotsman' he played five games for the Blades in the FA Cup and scored in their first ever Cup game against Scarborough in September 1889.

References

Association football midfielders
Scottish footballers
Sheffield United F.C. players
Year of birth missing
Place of birth missing
19th-century Scottish people
Year of death missing